Lorenz Spenning was a Gothic architect who was master of St Stephen's Cathedral, Vienna from 1454. He was present at the Regensburg Congress of 1459.

References 

Gothic architects
15th-century Austrian people
Year of birth unknown
Year of death unknown